The 2012 FFV State Knockout Cup was the second edition of a football (soccer) knockout-cup competition held between men's clubs in Victoria, Australia in 2012, the annual edition of the Dockerty Cup.

Teams

First Round Playoffs
Round 1 will contain clubs below State League 1. Clubs will play teams in their Zones and some teams will have a bye which automatically puts them into the second round. The draw was held on 2 March 2011 at 6pm AEDT. 

North-Eastern Draw

Central Draw

Southern Draw

Western Draw

Wimmera South Coast Draw

Gippsland Draw

The 2012 Battle of Britain Cup, the local Knockout Tournament in the Gippsland Region, acted as the qualifying for this region of the tournament, with the two finalists advancing to the Zone Playoffs regardless of the result of the Battle of Britain Cup Final.

The North-Western, Northern, Eastern, South-Eastern and Goulburn North-East draws did not begin until Round 2.

Second Round Playoffs

North-Eastern Draw

Central Draw

Southern Draw

Western Draw

Wimmera South Coast Draw

North-Western Draw

Northern Draw

Eastern Draw

South-Eastern Draw

Goulburn North-East Draw

Gippsland Draw

Third Round Playoffs

North-Eastern Draw

Central Draw

Southern Draw

Western Draw

North-Western Draw

Wimmera South Coast Draw

Northern Draw

Eastern Draw

South-Eastern Draw

Goulburn North-East Draw

Gippsland Draw

Zone Semi-Finals

This round will see the 12 teams from the Victorian Premier League and the 12 teams from the Victorian State League Division 1 enter the competition, alongside the 22 winners from the previous round. Two teams from the Loddon-Mallee region – Mildura City and Castlemaine Goldfields – entered the competition at this stage, without needing to qualify through preliminary matches. The Draw for this round took place on 10 April.

Zone Finals
The draw for this round took place on 9 May.

References

Soccer cup competitions in Australia
Soccer in Victoria (Australia)